Mauro Galindo (1958 – May 9, 2007) was a Spanish dancer and choreographer and instructor of Spanish dance.

Education
Received his BA in Art History and Classical Dance in Switzerland and at the Academy of Presses Grate in Montecarlo.

Career
He was professor of Theatre Institute of Barcelona starting in 1987 and worked in the Choreographic Center of the Generalitat Valenciana Teatres.

Spanish choreographers
Ballet choreographers
Spanish male dancers
1958 births
2007 deaths